Victoria Adejoke Orelope-Adefulire (born 29 September 1959)  is a Nigerian politician. She served as deputy governor of Lagos State from 2011 to 2015. Prior to that, she was the Commissioner for Women Affairs and Poverty Alleviation of Lagos State from 2003 to 2011. 

On 7 March 2016, Femi Adesina, the special adviser to the president, Media and Publicity stated President Muhammadu Buhari's appointment of the former Lagos deputy governor, Adejoke Orelope-Adefulire, as his Senior Special Assistant on Sustainable Development Goals.

Education 
She attended Salvation Army Primary School, Agege, Lagos (1965–1971), and she finished her secondary school education from St Joseph’s Secondary School, Mangoro, situated at Ikeja Local Government Area of Lagos State. She is an alumna of Lagos State University (LASU) and was awarded an honorary degree by the university. She has a bachelor's degree in sociology and a diploma in social works.

Personal life 
Victoria Adejoke Orelope, born into the royal lineage of Prince Kareem-Laka of Akeja Oniyanru and Amore Ruling House of Lagos State. She is the first girl and the third born out 13 children. Orelope-Adefuire is popularly called 'Iya Alanu' which means 'cheerful giver'. She worked at the Front Office Executive at PZ Industries, Nigeria PLC.

On 9 July 2016, Princess Adejoke Orelope-Adefuire staged a beautiful wedding for her daughter Esther Olaleye olawepo. Which took place at the Arch Bishop Vining Memorial Cathedral, GRA, Ikeja, Lagos.

Achievements 
Princess Adejoke Orelope Adefulire was conferred the award of The  International Public Servant of the year in 2007 by the UK-based Non-governmental Organization, The Scottish Widows.She got the Daisey George Award in 2010. In 201, she was recognised for her efforts in empowering and advocating rights of women and children.

The former Lagos State deputy governor is also a recipient of the Guinness World Records for the most children reading aloud with an adult at a single location, which she achieved while reading with 4,222 school children in 2011.

Career 
She is an administrator, social worker, politician and princess from a royal family. By the start of her pursuit  in politics, she was elected into the Lagos State House of Assembly to represent Alimosho Constituency I, where she creditably gained the respect of her fellow colleagues and was subsequently elected as the Chairman, House Service Committee. In the year 2002, she was appointed as the Electoral Commissioner at the Lagos State Independent Electoral Commissioner.

From 2003-2007, she was appointed Lagos State Commissioner for Women Affairs and was subsequently appointed to same position between 2007 and 2011. By 2011, she was elected the Deputy Governor of Lagos State and occupied the position till the end of the administration of His Excellency, Babatunde Raji Fashola in 2015. The President Muhammadu Buhari appointed, Adejoke Orelope-Adefulire, as his Senior Special Assistant on Sustainable Development Goals.

Some of her previous appointments are; Secretary, Francis Chambers, Ikeja (1980 – 1985); Secretary, Paterson Zochonis Industries Plc, Lagos (1985 – 1991); Managing Director/C.E.O., Adejoke Nigeria Enterprises, Lagos (1994 – 2002); Electoral Commissioner, Lagos State Independent Electoral Commission (2002 – 2003).

References

Living people
Place of birth missing (living people)
Deputy Governors of Lagos State
Yoruba women in politics
Women in Lagos politics
21st-century Nigerian politicians
21st-century Nigerian women politicians
1959 births